Synechodes is a genus of moths in the family Brachodidae.

Species
Synechodes agrippina (Meyrick, 1930) (Sulawesi, Indonesia)
Synechodes andamanus Kallies, 2004 (Andamans, India)
Synechodes coniophora Turner, 1913 (Australia)
Synechodes diabolus (Felder & Rogenhofer, 1875) (Moluccas, New Guinea)
Synechodes exigua Kallies, 2004 (Assam, India)
Synechodes fulvoris Kallies, 1998 (Sulawesi: Indonesia)
Synechodes lunaris Kallies, 2004 (Malaysia)
Synechodes megaloptera Kallies, 1998 (northern Borneo)
Synechodes olivora Kallies, 1998 (Malaysia, Java)
Synechodes papuana Heppner, 1990 (New Guinea)
Synechodes platysema (Meyrick, 1921) (Java: Indonesia)
Synechodes polias Kallies, 2013
Synechodes rotanicola Kallies, 2004 (Java: Indonesia)
Synechodes royalis Kallies, 1998 (Myanmar)
Synechodes rubroris Kallies, 1998 (Sulawesi: Indonesia)
Synechodes sidereus Kallies, 2004 (New Guinea)
Synechodes sumatrana Kallies, 2000 (Sumatra: Indonesia)
Synechodes tamila Kallies, 2013

References

Brachodidae
Moth genera
Taxa named by Alfred Jefferis Turner